Henri Frémart (Beauvais, Picardy c. 1595 – 1651) was a French priest and composer. He was at Notre Dame de Paris from 1625 until 1640.

Works
Missa Confundantur superbi

References

Sources
Jean-Paul C. Montagnier, The Polyphonic Mass in France, 1600–1780: The Evidence of the Printed Choirbooks, Cambridge: Cambridge University Press, 2017.

1590s births
1651 deaths
People from Beauvais
French composers of sacred music
French Baroque composers
French male composers
Year of birth uncertain
17th-century male musicians